Stian Thomassen (born 8 August 1977) is a retired Norwegian football defender.

He came through the youth ranks of Lillestrøm SK and was drafted into the first team in 1996. He also represented Norway as a youth and under-21 international. Playing 27 Lillestrøm league games over three seasons, he spent 1998 on loan to FK Haugesund. He left the top tier to play three seasons for HamKam, four for Nybergsund and one for Ull/Kisa.

References

1976 births
Living people
People from Skedsmo
Norwegian footballers
Lillestrøm SK players
FK Haugesund players
Hamarkameratene players
Nybergsund IL players
Ullensaker/Kisa IL players
Norwegian First Division players
Eliteserien players
Association football defenders
Norway youth international footballers
Norway under-21 international footballers
Sportspeople from Viken (county)